Wild! is the fourth studio album by British band Erasure. Released in 1989, it was the follow-up album to their 1988 breakthrough The Innocents. The album was produced by Erasure, along with Gareth Jones and Mark Saunders and released by Mute Records in the UK and Sire Records in the US.

History 

Although the album did not generate any entries on the Billboard Hot 100, Wild! is highly regarded amongst Erasure's fanbase as one of their best albums, containing now-classic singles like "Drama!", "Blue Savannah" and "Star". In the US, several songs gained exposure on college radio and three songs charted on Billboards Hot Dance Music/Club Play chart. "You Surround Me" was not released as a single in the United States.

During production, singer Andy Bell recorded with producer Gareth Jones, while Vince Clarke handled synths and programming with producer Mark Saunders at Vince's home studio—both in London.

In the UK, Wild! continued Erasure's mainstream success: it became their second consecutive number-one album and its four singles all hit the UK top 20.  The album also charted well in Germany, where it hit number sixteen.

It was while promoting the Wild! album that Erasure launched the first of their many elaborately staged concert tours—this one featuring gigantic sets and props and several costume changes for band members Vince Clarke and Andy Bell, as well as several back-up singers and dancers. Over 100 dates were played, culminating in their biggest headlining show at the Milton Keynes Bowl in front of 60,000 fans.

Track listing
All tracks written by Andy Bell and Vince Clarke.

Original edition
 "Piano Song – Instrumental" – 1:09
 "Blue Savannah" – 4:27
 "Drama!" – 4:04
 "How Many Times?" – 3:17
 "Star" – 3:53
 "La Gloria" – 3:10
 "You Surround Me" – 3:57
 "Brother and Sister" – 3:24
 "2,000 Miles" – 3:38
 "Crown of Thorns" – 3:59
 "Piano Song" – 3:15

2016 "Erasure 30" 30th anniversary BMG reissue LP
Subsequent to their acquisition of Erasure's back catalogue, and in anticipation of the band's 30th anniversary, BMG commissioned reissues of all previously released UK editions of Erasure albums up to and including 2007's Light at the End of the World. All titles were pressed and distributed by Play It Again Sam on 180-gram vinyl and shrinkwrapped with a custom anniversary sticker.

2019 30th anniversary CD release
A two-disc version of the album was released by BMG in the UK and Europe on 29 March 2019 to commemorate the original 1989 release. It features the remastered album on disc one and a selection of rarities, B-sides, live tracks, and new remixes on disc two.CD2: B-Sides, Remixes and Rarities'
 "Sweet, Sweet Baby" (The Moo Moo Mix) – 5:12
 "Drama!" (Richard Norris Mix) – 6:39
 "Blue Savannah" (Mark Saunders 12" Mix) – 6:51
 "Piano Song" (Live at the London Arena) – 3:34
 "Runaround on the Underground" (Remix) – 6:38
 "How Many Times?" (Alternative Mix) – 3:17
 "Supernature" (Daniel Miller and Phil Legg Remix) – 6:53
 "Star" (Soul Mix) – 5:22
 "No G.D.M." (Unfinished Mix) – 4:25
 "Drama! (Act 2)" – 5:38
 "Brother and Sister" (Live at the London Arena)" - 3:33
 "Dreamlike State" (7" A Capella Mix)" - 3:29
 "You Surround Me" (Gareth Jones Mix)" - 6:17
 "91 Steps" (6 Pianos Mix) – 5:24

Charts

Weekly charts

Year-end charts

Certifications

References 

1989 albums
Erasure albums
Mute Records albums
Sire Records albums
Albums produced by Gareth Jones (music producer)
Albums produced by Mark Saunders (record producer)